In partition calculus, part of combinatorial set theory, a branch of mathematics, the Erdős–Rado theorem  is a basic result extending Ramsey's theorem to uncountable sets. It is named after Paul Erdős and Richard Rado. It is sometimes also attributed to Đuro Kurepa who proved it under the additional assumption of the generalised continuum hypothesis, and hence the result is sometimes also referred to as the Erdős–Rado–Kurepa theorem.

Statement of the theorem
If r ≥ 0  is finite and κ is an infinite cardinal, then

where exp0(κ) = κ and inductively expr+1(κ)=2expr(κ). This is sharp in the sense that expr(κ)+ cannot be replaced by expr(κ) on the left hand side.

The above partition symbol describes the following statement. If f is a coloring of the r+1-element subsets of a set of cardinality expr(κ)+,  in κ many colors, then there is a homogeneous set of cardinality κ+ (a set, all whose r+1-element subsets get the same f-value).

Notes

References

Set theory
Theorems in combinatorics
Rado theorem